The 2007 Super League Grand Final was 10th official Grand Final and the conclusive and championship-deciding match of the Super League XII season. Held on Saturday 13 October 2007, at Old Trafford in Manchester, the game was played between St. Helens, who finished top of the league after the 27 weekly rounds, and Leeds Rhinos, who finished second after the weekly rounds.

Background

Going into this game, St Helens had never lost in a Grand Final - they had won in 1999, 2000, 2002 and 2006. Leeds Rhinos had one win from 2004 and two losses (1998 and 2005).

The St Helens stand-off, Leon Pryce, made a record-breaking seventh Grand Final appearance by playing in this game with previous appearances playing with Bradford Bulls and St Helens.

The pre-match coin toss was won by Leeds Rhinos. They chose to kick off and defended from the Stretford End of Old Trafford.

Katherine Jenkins was forced to withdraw herself from the pre-match entertainment due to a flu bug, her replacement was Russell Watson, who performed the Grand Final hymn, Jerusalem. Watson performed before the game at the first Super League Grand Final.

Route to the Final

St Helens

Leeds Rhinos

Match details

References

St Helens R.F.C. matches
Leeds Rhinos matches
Super League Grand Finals
Grand final